Deserticossus lukhtanovi is a moth in the family Cossidae. It is found in Tadzhikistan.

The length of the forewings is 19–22 mm. The forewings are dark-grey, with darker scales. The hindwings are uniform dark-grey.

References

Natural History Museum Lepidoptera generic names catalog

Cossinae
Moths described in 2006
Moths of Asia